

Most successful clubs by titles

League

Titles
Most League titles: 35 (27 professional era), Ajax
Most consecutive League titles: 4, joint record:
Professional era
 PSV (1985/86, 86/87, 87/88, 88/89)  and (2004/05, 05/06, 06/07, 07/08)
 Ajax (2010/11, 11/12, 12/13, 13/14)
Amateur era
 HVV Den Haag (1899/1900, 00/01, 01/02, 02/03)

Cup

Titles
Most Cup titles: 20, Ajax
Most consecutive Cup titles: 3, joint record:
 Ajax (1969/70, 70/71, 71/72)
 PSV (1987/88, 88/89, 89/90)

Records